Anne-Marie Nicholson (born 1991) is an English singer-songwriter.

Anne-Marie may also refer to:

 Queen Anne-Marie of Greece, former Queen consort of Greece
 Anne-Marie (film), a 1936 French drama film directed by Raymond Bernard
 Anne-Marie (given name), including a list of people with the name
 Anne-Marie, a 1981 book by French writer Lucien Bodard
 3667 Anne-Marie, an asteroid

See also
Ann Marie (born 1995), American singer-songwriter